Airport Tunnel is a road tunnel located in Chek Lap Kok, Lantau Island, Hong Kong, which connects Hong Kong–Zhuhai–Macau Bridge Hong Kong Port with Hong Kong International Airport. 

This is one of the two tunnels constructed in Hong Kong–Zhuhai–Macau Bridge Hong Kong Link Road project, with the other one being Scenic Hill Tunnel.

References 

Tunnels in Hong Kong
Tunnels completed in 2018
Chek Lap Kok